The Joe Plaskett Foundation Award also known as "The Plaskett" is an annual Canadian Arts prize, worth $30,000, awarded in partnership with the Royal Canadian Academy of the Arts (RCA) to a recent or current MFA graduate student with a specialization in painting.  

The Joseph Plaskett Foundation was established in 2004 by Canadian-born artist Joseph Plaskett, to support a mature Canadian student to travel and make art in Europe for one year in emulation of what Emily Carr allowed Plaskett to do in 1946. The Royal Canadian Academy of Arts partnered with the Joseph Plaskett Foundation in 2009 to support and administer the award process.

Award recipients 
 Mark Neufeld (2004)
 Jennifer Lefort (2005)
 Ehryn Torrell (2006)
 Todd Tremeer (2007)
 Nam Duc Nguyen (2008)
 Vitaly Medvedovsky (2009)
 Megan Hepburn (2010)
 Jessica Groome (2011)
 Philip Delisle (2012)
 Julie Trudel (2013)
 Collin Johanson (2014)
 Stanzie Tooth (2015)
 Ambera Wellmann (2016)
Caroline Mousseau (2019)

References 

Canadian art awards
Awards established in 2004